The Municipality of Lukovica is a municipality in the eastern part of the Upper Carniola region in Slovenia. The seat of the municipality is Lukovica pri Domžalah. It lies on the main road from Ljubljana to Celje and has been an independent municipality since 1994.

Settlements
In addition to the municipal seat of Lukovica pri Domžalah, the municipality also includes the following settlements:

 Blagovica
 Brdo pri Lukovici
 Brezovica pri Zlatem Polju
 Bršlenovica
 Čeplje
 Češnjice
 Dupeljne
 Gabrje pod Špilkom
 Golčaj
 Gorenje
 Gradišče pri Lukovici
 Hribi
 Imovica
 Javorje pri Blagovici
 Jelša
 Kompolje
 Koreno
 Korpe
 Krajno Brdo
 Krašnja
 Lipa
 Log
 Mala Lašna
 Mali Jelnik
 Obrše
 Podgora pri Zlatem Polju
 Podmilj
 Podsmrečje
 Poljane nad Blagovico
 Preserje pri Lukovici
 Preserje pri Zlatem Polju
 Prevalje
 Prevoje
 Prevoje pri Šentvidu
 Prilesje
 Prvine
 Rafolče
 Selce
 Šentožbolt
 Šentvid pri Lukovici
 Spodnje Koseze
 Spodnje Loke
 Spodnje Prapreče
 Spodnji Petelinjek
 Straža
 Suša
 Trnjava
 Trnovče
 Trojane
 Učak
 V Zideh
 Veliki Jelnik
 Videm pri Lukovici
 Vošce
 Vranke
 Vrba
 Vrh nad Krašnjo
 Vrhovlje
 Zavrh pri Trojanah
 Zgornje Loke
 Zgornje Prapreče
 Zgornji Petelinjek
 Žirovše
 Zlatenek
 Zlato Polje

References

External links

Municipality of Lukovica on Geopedia

 
Lukovica
1994 establishments in Slovenia